Willow was a station on the Chicago Rapid Transit Company's North Side Main Line, which is now part of the Chicago Transit Authority's Brown Line. The station was located at 940-44 W. Willow Street in the Lincoln Park neighborhood of Chicago. Willow was situated south of Armitage and north of Halsted, which is now closed. Willow opened in 1905 and closed on May 17, 1942, to allow for the construction of  a new portal to the State Street subway.

References

Defunct Chicago "L" stations
Railway stations in the United States opened in 1905
Railway stations closed in 1942
1905 establishments in Illinois
1942 disestablishments in Illinois